Lakeside is a city in Coos County, Oregon, United States. The population was 1,699 at the 2010 census.

Geography and climate

Lakeside borders Tenmile Lake and Tenmile Creek, which flows from the lake to the ocean.

Demographics

2010 census
As of the census of 2010, there were 1,699 people, 806 households, and 489 families residing in the city. The racial makeup of the city was 94.4% White, 0.3% African American, 1.5% Native American, 0.2% Asian, 0.9% from other races, and 2.6% from two or more races. Hispanic or Latino of any race were 3.2% of the population.

There were 806 households, of which 14.0% had children under the age of 18 living with them, 49.3% were married couples living together, 6.6% had a female householder with no husband present, 4.8% had a male householder with no wife present, and 39.3% were non-families. 30.1% of all households were made up of individuals, and 15.3% had someone living alone who was 65 years of age or older. The average household size was 2.08 and the average family size was 2.49.

The median age in the city was 57.9 years. 11.9% of residents were under the age of 18; 3.5% were between the ages of 18 and 24; 14.3% were from 25 to 44; 35.5% were from 45 to 64; and 34.7% were 65 years of age or older. The gender makeup of the city was 51.0% male and 49.0% female.

2000 census

As of the census of 2000, there were 1,371 people, 649 households, and 436 families residing in the city. The population density was 692.7 people per square mile (267.3/km2). There were 764 housing units at an average density of 386.0 per square mile (149.0/km2). The racial makeup of the city was 93.73% White, 0.15% African American, 1.75% Native American, 0.44% Asian, 0.07% Pacific Islander, 0.95% from other races, and 2.92% from two or more races. Hispanic or Latino of any race were 2.55% of the population.

There were 649 households, out of which 15.9% had children under the age of 18 living with them, 57.6% were married couples living together, 6.8% had a female householder with no husband present, and 32.7% were non-families. 26.8% of all households were made up of individuals, and 13.7% had someone living alone who was 65 years of age or older. The average household size was 2.11 and the average family size was 2.50.

In the city, the population dispersal was 14.6% under the age of 18, 4.3% from 18 to 24, 17.9% from 25 to 44, 33.2% from 45 to 64, and 30.1% who were 65 years of age or older. The median age was 53 years. For every 100 females, there were 98.1 males. For every 100 females age 18 and over, there were 96.1 males.

The median income for a household in the city was $25,781, and the median income for a family was $34,688. Males had a median income of $31,364 versus $20,568 for females. The per capita income for the city was $16,702. About 11.6% of families and 15.2% of the population were below the poverty line, including 25.3% of those under age 18 and 7.9% of those age 65 or over.

Transportation
 Lakeside State Airport

References

External links
 Entry for Lakeside in the Oregon Blue Book
 Unofficial commercial Lakeside news and information site

Cities in Oregon
Populated coastal places in Oregon
Cities in Coos County, Oregon
1974 establishments in Oregon